Terthreutis sphaerocosma is a species of moth of the family Tortricidae. It is found in India (Assam, Sikkim), Bhutan and Nepal.

The wingspan is 20–25 mm. The ground colour of the forewings is whitish, the costa, submedian area and terminal part of the wing suffused with pale ochreous cream. The strigulae (fine streaks) are brownish. The hindwings are whitish and the anal area is suffused with brownish.

References

Moths described in 1918
Archipini